St. Mary's Bank is a credit union based in Manchester, New Hampshire. Founded in 1908, it is the first credit union in the United States.

Membership
Credit unions are not-for-profit, cooperative financial institutions owned by each member. While St. Mary's service area is primarily New Hampshire, it is one of the few credit unions that allow membership throughout the entire United States, with valid residence. To become a member of St. Mary's Bank, one must purchase a single share of the credit union's capital stock, which costs $5.

Finance and services

Assets

Services
As of 2023, St. Mary's Bank has 11 branches, all in New Hampshire: five in Manchester, two in Nashua, and one each in Hudson, Londonderry, Milford and Portsmouth. The credit union also has a mortgage center in Concord.

The credit union offers personal banking, business banking, savings, checking, investment, mortgages, home equity, auto loans, online banking, and debit and credit cards.

History
In 1908, Monseigneur Pierre Hevey, pastor of Sainte-Marie's parish in Manchester, organized what was soon to be known as the first credit union. The goal was to help the primarily Franco-American mill workers save and borrow money. On November 24, 1908, the business officially opened its doors in Manchester as "La Caisse Populaire, Ste-Marie" (The People’s Bank) and became the first credit union in the nation. In April 1909, the New Hampshire Senate and House of Representatives approved a charter to incorporate under the name of St. Mary's Cooperative Credit Association. Transactions were conducted at the home of Joseph Boivin, the credit union's first president, on Notre Dame Avenue. An all-volunteer staff assisted with daily activities. The safe was a used metal box purchased from Manchester's French daily newspaper, L'Avenir National. Operating conditions were basic, but it was the mission that mattered.

St. Mary's Bank made it possible for Manchester's immigrants to achieve the better quality of life they had envisioned. For just $5, the price of one share of capital stock, anyone in the community could become a member. Savings were accepted from workers, families, and children. The accumulated savings were, in turn, lent to members to purchase and build homes, establish neighborhood businesses, and meet the personal financial needs of the community.

St. Mary's Bank prospered. The credit union moved into its own offices in 1913 and hired its first paid, full-time manager in 1916. In 1917, the state legislature approved a bill changing the name from "St. Mary's Cooperative Credit Association" to "La Caisse Populaire, Ste-Marie". By 1923, the credit union's assets exceeded $1 million. In 1925, an amended charter allowed the institution to be called either "La Caisse Populaire, Ste-Marie", or "St. Mary's Bank".

In 1930, St. Mary's Bank moved into "The Marble Building", a landmark in the center of what was then the commercial heart of Manchester's West Side. As the credit union expanded, so did its menu of traditional products and services. Checking accounts, Christmas Club accounts, safe deposit boxes and a wider variety of loans became available. By the mid 1950s, St. Mary's was serving several thousand members and had $6 million in assets. In 1970, St. Mary's Bank built and moved into its present main office at McGregor Street in Manchester.

Over the years, St. Mary's Bank has helped members through difficult times, including the Great Depression and the bankruptcy of the Amoskeag Manufacturing Company in 1935. When thousands of banks failed during the Great Depression, St. Mary's Bank remained open, even during the "Bank Holiday" of 1933, when President Roosevelt closed all banks nationwide. St. Mary's Bank also survived the economic disruptions of the early 1990s, which saw the failure of many familiar Manchester banks.

In 2008, St. Mary's Bank celebrated 100 years of service to the people of New Hampshire. Today, the credit union is a full-service financial institution serving a diverse population. It is as welcoming to new immigrants today as it was to the French Canadian population at the turn of the last century. It costs no more to belong to St. Mary's Bank now than it did in 1908. For just $5, anyone can become a member, by purchasing one share of capital stock.

The building where Attorney Boivin first managed the business of the credit union became America's Credit Union Museum in 2002 and is listed on the National Register of Historic Places. The building serves as a historical and educational site for the credit union movement. The public can visit the original office and imagine being there when the first deposits were made. The building was donated by owners Armand and Joanne Lemire to a non-profit foundation in 1994. Mr. Lemire served on the Board of Directors at St. Mary's Bank from 1994 until his death in 2003. America's Credit Union Museum is located at 418-420 Notre Dame Avenue, Manchester, New Hampshire.

See also
History of credit unions

References

External links
Official website

Credit unions based in New Hampshire
Banks established in 1908
Companies based in Manchester, New Hampshire